Nawadah railway station is a main railway station of Nawada in Nawada district, Bihar. Its code is NWD. It serves Nawada town. The station consists of 2 platforms. The platform is well sheltered. Although it is a category C station, it lacks many facilities like most good C class stations. The station lies on Gaya–Kiul line of East Central Railway

Major trains 

The following trains run from Nawada railway station:

 Gaya–Howrah Express
 Gaya–Jamalpur Passenger (unreserved)
 Gaya–Kiul Passenger (unreserved)
 Gaya–Jhajha Fast Passenger (unreserved)
 Kamakhya–Gaya Weekly Express
 Rampurhat–Gaya Passenger (unreserved)
 Goda–New Delhi Humsafar Exp (weekly)

References

Nawada

Railway stations in Nawada district
Danapur railway division